The following is a list of persons who served as governor of Northern Mariana Islands. The term of office is 4 years. The longest-serving governors in CNMI history are Pedro Tenorio, who served 12 years in office from 1982 to 1990 and from 1998 to 2002, and Benigno Fitial, who served 7 years, one month, and 11 days from 2006 to 2013.

The current governor is Arnold Palacios, since January 9, 2023.

List
 Parties

Resident Commissioners

Governors

Succession

See also
 List of governors of the Spanish Mariana Islands
 List of governors of Guam
 High Commissioner of the Trust Territory of the Pacific Islands
 Lieutenant Governor of the Northern Mariana Islands

Footnotes

References

External links
 Former CNMI Governor Guerrero Passes Away

Northern Mariana